Beda Batka (August 21, 1922 – June 6, 1994) was a Czech and American cinematographer and a teacher in the Tisch School of the Arts.

He was best known for working on films Marketa Lazarová and Little Darlings.

Filmography

References

External links

 Bedřich Baťka on Kinobox.cz
  Bedřich Baťka on ČSFD.cz

1922 births
1994 deaths
Tisch School of the Arts faculty
American cinematographers
Czech cinematographers
Czechoslovak emigrants to the United States
Mass media people from Prague